Millennium Business Center is a class A office building located in the city of Bucharest, Romania. It stands at a height of 72 meters (approx. 236 feet) and has 19 floors, with a total surface of 26,600 m2.

Fire on June 27, 2009 
Around 11:00 PM on June 26, 2009, the building was engulfed in flames after a large billboard near the building exploded, most likely because it was struck by lightning.
Two hours later, at 1:10 AM on June 27, around 150 firefighters from Sector 2 (Bucharest) were still trying to stop the fire, although the main source of the fire had already been taken care of.

References 

Skyscraper office buildings in Bucharest
Office buildings completed in 2006